Northern pride may refer to:

Northern Pride (festival), LGBT Festival in Newcastle upon Tyne
Northern Pride RLFC, Australian rugby league club
Grundy's Northern Pride, British television programme